Patricia O'Brien Cotter was a Montana Supreme Court Associate Justice first elected on November 7, 2000, filling the seat of the retired Justice William E. Hunt.  Originally from South Bend, Indiana, she graduated with honors in 1972 from Western Michigan University with a B.S. in Political Science and History. Justice Cotter's law degree is from the Notre Dame Law School in 1977.

Justice Cotter practiced law for six years in South Bend, after which she and her husband Michael Cotter moved to Montana. She practiced law in Great Falls, Montana with John Hoyt during 1984-1985. She and her husband established the firm of Cotter and Cotter in 1985. She is admitted to practice before the Fort Peck Tribal Court of Appeals, the Eighth and Ninth Circuit Courts of Appeals, the United States Court of Claims, and the United States Supreme Court.

Cotter was reelected to a second term in 2008, and retired in 2016.

References

Living people
Justices of the Montana Supreme Court
Montana lawyers
Western Michigan University alumni
Notre Dame Law School alumni
People from South Bend, Indiana
Politicians from Great Falls, Montana
Year of birth missing (living people)
American women judges
21st-century American women
20th-century American women judges
20th-century American judges
21st-century American women judges
21st-century American judges